Diogo António Taborda Gaspar (born 21 January 1992) is a Portuguese footballer who plays for ADRC Pedrógão as a right back.

Football career
On 31 July 2013, he made his professional debut with Sporting Covilhã in a 2013–14 Taça da Liga match against Desportivo Chaves, when he played the full game and scored his first goal (41st minute) . While only playing two league games as a substitute, he played 6 cup games for Covilhã.

References

External links

Stats and profile at LPFP
Diogo Gaspar at ZeroZero

1992 births
Living people
People from Covilhã
Portuguese footballers
Association football midfielders
S.C. Covilhã players
Sportspeople from Castelo Branco District